Security State Bank or Security State Bank Building may refer to:

in the United States (by state)
 Security State Bank (Eskridge, Kansas), listed on the National Register of Historic Places (NRHP) in Kansas
 Security State Bank Building (Broken Bow, Nebraska), listed on the NRHP in Nebraska
 Security State Bank (Willow Lake, South Dakota), listed on the NRHP in South Dakota